Cercy-la-Tour is a commune in the Nièvre department in central France.

Geography
The village is located in the middle of the commune, where the river Alène joins the Aron.

Demographics

See also
Communes of the Nièvre department

References

External links

 City Official Website

Communes of Nièvre
Nivernais